Sterculia guttata, the spotted sterculia, is a species of plant in the family Malvaceae. Extracts from its seeds have been tested for use as an insecticide against mosquito larvae.

References

guttata
Flora of India (region)
Flora of Assam (region)
Flora of the Andaman Islands
Flora of Bangladesh
Flora of Myanmar
Flora of Thailand
Flora of Laos
Plants described in 1814